Adisham railway station is on the Dover branch of the Chatham Main Line in England, and serves the village of Adisham, Kent.

The station and all trains that serve the station are operated by Southeastern.

There are brick buildings on the country-bound platform, formerly in railway use but now privately occupied, and a wooden shelter on the London-bound platform. The country-bound platform is accessible by road and the London-bound by public footpath. There is a connecting footbridge.

The station is unstaffed. There is a help point on each platform, electronic departure boards were added in May 2016 and a ticket machine (accepting credit/debit cards) in October the same year.

History

The station and the line it serves were built by the London, Chatham & Dover Railway, and opened on 22 July 1861, becoming part of the Southern Railway during the grouping of 1923. The line then passed on to the Southern Region of British Railways on nationalisation in 1948 until the privatisation of British Railways.

When sectorisation was introduced, the station was served by Network SouthEast.

Services
All services at Adisham are operated by Southeastern using  EMUs.

The typical off-peak service in trains per hour is:
 1 tph to  via 
 1 tph to 

During the peak hours, the service is increased to 2 tph.

References
References

Sources

External links

 
Station on navigable O.S. map

City of Canterbury
Railway stations in Kent
DfT Category F2 stations
Former London, Chatham and Dover Railway stations
Railway stations in Great Britain opened in 1861
Railway stations served by Southeastern
1861 establishments in England